Ken Carpenter may refer to:

Ken Carpenter (gridiron football) (1926–2011), American and Canadian football player, 1950–1960
Ken Carpenter (announcer) (1900–1984), NBC radio announcer
Ken Carpenter (discus thrower) (1913–1984), 1936 Summer Olympics gold medalist in the discus throw
Ken Carpenter (cyclist) (born 1965), American track cyclist
Ken Carpenter (journalist) (born 1956), American journalist and journalism professor
Kenneth Carpenter (born 1949), American paleontologist